Conus taeniatus, common name the ringed cone, is a species of sea snail, a marine gastropod mollusk in the family Conidae, the cone snails and their allies.

Like all species within the genus Conus, these snails are predatory and venomous. They are capable of "stinging" humans, therefore live ones should be handled carefully or not at all.

Description
The size of the shell varies between 15 mm and 50 mm. The shell is indistinctly zoned alternately with pale violaceous and white, vividly encircled with fillets of dark chocolate and white articulations. The spire is obsoletely coronated.

Distribution
This marine species occurs in the Red Sea, the Strait of Hormuz and off Kenya.

References

 Tucker J.K. & Tenorio M.J. (2013) Illustrated catalog of the living cone shells. 517 pp. Wellington, Florida: MdM Publishing.
 Puillandre N., Duda T.F., Meyer C., Olivera B.M. & Bouchet P. (2015). One, four or 100 genera? A new classification of the cone snails. Journal of Molluscan Studies. 81: 1–23

External links
 The Conus Biodiversity website
 Cone Shells – Knights of the Sea	
 

taeniatus
Gastropods described in 1792